The 2011 NCAA Division I Field Hockey Championship was the 31st women's collegiate field hockey tournament organized by the National Collegiate Athletic Association, to determine the top college field hockey team in the United States. The Maryland Terrapins won their seventh championship, defeating the North Carolina Tar Heels in the final, a rematch of the previous year's final. The semifinals and championship were hosted by the University of Louisville at Trager Stadium in Louisville, Kentucky.

Bracket

References 

2011
Field Hockey
2011 in women's field hockey
Sports competitions in Louisville, Kentucky
2011 in sports in Kentucky